"Brian the Brain" is the ninth episode of the second series of Space: 1999 (and the thirty-third episode overall of the programme).  The screenplay was written by Jack Ronder; the director was Kevin Connor.  The final shooting script is dated 5 May 1976, with amendments dated 11 May 1976.  Live action filming took place Tuesday 18 May 1976 through Wednesday 2 June 1976.

Story
It is 1150 days after leaving Earth orbit, and Moonbase Alpha is in the midst of a major project.  Throughout their captive journey through space, the various scientific departments have each acquired tremendous quantities of data.  This data is now being reviewed and uploaded to the Main Computer memory banks.  While the Research Section concentrates on this endeavour, the non-scientific personnel are enjoying a bit of a rest.  The relaxed atmosphere in Command Centre is interrupted, however, when Computer begins displaying new data indicating a gradual but increasing change in the Moon's trajectory.

The data review is cancelled as the staff addresses this new development.  Sensors cannot locate a gravity source and a 360-degree visual scan reveals no visible objects in range.  Despite the lack of evidence, Computer insists the rate of change is accelerating—they are closing with whatever is pulling them.  A horrifying question is raised:  is the Moon being drawn into a collision course with a black dwarf?  With time apparently running out, John Koenig orders an immediate evacuation.  Transporter Eagles rise on the launch pads and flee as quickly as they are loaded.

While coordinating the exodus, the Command Centre staff sights a celestial body at extreme range.  After Computer sluggishly offers vague estimates regarding its identity, Maya calculates the object to be a small planet with a gravitational pull approximating the Moon's—insufficient to affect their course.  With the instruments still unable to locate the gravity source, she questions Computer's reliability, wondering whether the course change is real...or false data resulting from a malfunction.  Before they can investigate this possibility, the staff is distracted by the sight of a spacecraft streaking across the screen.

To their amazement, it is identified as a Swift, an Earth vessel which pre-dates the Eagle.  Eagles One and Two are dispatched from the evacuation fleet to intercept the mystery craft.  After determining that the Swift is not the abnormal gravity source, they approach.  When audio contact is established, the Swift's pilot hoots and hollers at the sight of the Eagles.  Witty and irreverent, he is thrilled to have run across other expatriates from planet Earth.  The Alphans are shocked when he identifies himself as a member of the lost Star Mission of 1996.

When Maya goes to verify this, Computer responds efficiently for the first time during this crisis.  Under the command of Captain Michael, she reads, a mother ship and four Swifts left Earth in 1996 on an interstellar voyage of discovery.  Their fate is a mystery due to a sudden break in communications.  Her history lesson is interrupted by the pilot requesting permission to land.  In spite of the emergency, the Alphans are intrigued by this eccentric character.  Koenig clears the Swift for landing.  He and Helena Russell go to meet the visitor...but find the ship empty.

Suddenly, a segment of the flight console rolls outward to greet them.  The pilot is a robot.  Though primitive in appearance, it is an advanced cybernetic intelligence.  Self-aware and self-programming, the mobile electronic brain is connected to the Swift's on-board computer by the antenna cable trailing behind it.  When asked its name, the robot admits it has none.  It recalls that, after activation, it mispronounced 'brain' as 'Brian', which the Alphans adopt as its moniker.  It is the sole survivor of the Star Mission crew.  Years ago, they landed on the nearby planet (designated 'Planet D') and the entire crew instantly died.

During its visit to Alpha, Brian's antics amuse the staff, especially when it tries to chat up a comely equipment trolley with yellow plastic wheels.  While the others are charmed, Maya is concerned when the robot engages in an electronic dialogue with Computer.  When learning of the Moon's course change, Brian offers to investigate; in return, it asks if Helena could help identify what killed its captain and crew.  Koenig and the doctor return with it to the Swift.  Suspicious of Brian, Maya tries to monitor its activity.  Opening a channel to the Swift, she discovers the communications system is dead.

Unseen by Alpha, the Swift unexpectedly departs with Koenig and Helena aboard.  Brian's formerly friendly demeanour turns nasty as it announces their destination is Planet D.  Koenig tries to adjust the manual controls, but all functions are channeled through the devious robot.  Brian then threatens to open the airlocks and blow the pair out into space unless the Commander surrenders his stun-gun.  Koenig reluctantly complies and the robot disposes of the weapon.

On Moonbase, all main systems are non-responsive.  It seems the entire computer network has been disabled.  Maya recalls Brian's chat with Computer; she speculates that it either blocked every link to Computer or downloaded the operating system to its own memory core on the Swift before erasing theirs.  Either way, Moonbase Alpha is effectively blind.  Upon learning the Eagles' on-board computers are operating normally, Tony Verdeschi takes up a squadron to rescue the abductees.

Koenig presses Brian for information on the Moon's course.  It announces the Moon and Planet D are now circling one another—and will continue to do so forever.  As the captives digest this revelation, the Swift decelerates, allowing the Eagle posse to catch up.  Fearing the mercurial Brian may be planning to blind the four ships, the Commander contacts Verdeschi on Eagle One, ordering him to break off the pursuit.  While Koenig assures the security chief that he and Helena are unharmed, the co-pilot insults Brian, referring to it as a 'crazy hijacking slot machine'.

The robot childishly rants and raves over the astronaut's remark.  Koenig commands the pursuit ships and all evacuees to return to Alpha immediately.  The Eagles withdraw, and the Swift resumes course for Planet D.  Now calm, Brian tries to make friends with Koenig and Helena; as lovers, he says, they should appreciate this private time together.  Not trusting the robot, they deny having feelings for each other.  To determine the truth, Brian devises a practical 'love test'.  It begins by separating Koenig and Helena, instructing them to enter one of the ship's two airlocks alone—and blasting them with beams of concentrated ultraviolet when they refuse.

Once they are sealed inside their respective airlocks, Brian begins siphoning out the air.  At any time, he tells them, one may press a button to channel the remaining air into the other airlock—saving its occupant from suffocation.  The air thins gradually and, at first, the pair resist.  In the end, gasping and floundering, they each hit their buttons simultaneously.  Having proven they are a couple in love, Brian is ecstatic.  Threatening one lover guarantees control over the other.  It childishly whistles 'Here Comes the Bride' as it prepares to land on Planet D.

Setting down close to the mother ship, they finds the surface is blanketed in a dense mist which reduces visibility to mere metres.  Here, the true purpose of the abduction is revealed—unable to navigate the terrain outside, it needs Koenig to board the larger ship and retrieve the fuel core.  Brian believes it is immortal; its goal is to roam the universe forever.  The mother ship carries enough nuclear fuel to last a billion years.  Helena will remain aboard Swift to insure Koenig's cooperation.  Clad in protective gear, the Commander walks toward the other craft.

As he proceeds across the alien moor, he encounters corpses of the Star Mission crew strewn about.  From their appearance, he realises the atmosphere is poisonous.  Circling around to the far side of the ship, he loses contact with the Swift.  The longer Koenig is away, the more agitated Brian becomes; hoping to distract the machine, Helena engages it in conversation.  Brian fondly relates how it was constructed and educated by Captain Michael.  Displaying candid photos of the man it calls 'Father', it demonstrates affection for the captain as a child would for a parent.

Boarding the mother ship, Koenig is pleasantly surprised to find Verdeschi and Maya waiting for him.  While the other Eagles returned to base, theirs travelled to Planet D at full thrust, arriving before the Swift.  On the command deck, they find Captain Michael sitting at his desk, dead.  A check of the ship's computer reveals it, too, has been blinded.  This explains why the crew willingly disembarked into a toxic atmosphere and how Captain Michael was left without life-support.  Not only is Brian mad, but a homicidal maniac as well.

On an adjacent work bench, they spy a half-assembled construct that bears a striking resemblance to Brian.  With this final piece of the puzzle revealed, Koenig now knows how to defeat Brian—by breaking its mind.  For this psychological assault, he will need Maya's assistance; as a mouse, the metamorph will be smuggled aboard the Swift in Koenig's pocket.  On returning to the other ship, an impatient Brian insists the Commander insert the core into the fuel store immediately.  When the transfer is complete, the robot giddily celebrates.  As Koenig removes Maya from his jacket, the Swift lifts off.

The revelry ends when Brian feels the Maya/Mouse biting its antenna.  Koenig states the mouse has come bearing a message from Captain Michael: 'Revenge.'  Confronting the unstable robot, the Commander accuses it of having killed its master.  When a flustered Brian denies the allegation, Koenig reveals the truth:  Brian blinded the mother ship and killed its beloved father to prevent a new electronic brain from being built.  He saw Brian's replacement sitting on a work bench.  Just then, Maya appears in the form of Captain Michael.  Now confronted by its dead father, Brian blows several circuits out of panic.

Koenig and company continue to verbally batter the hysterical robot with repeated accusations.  Like a guilty child, Brian tries to hide, ending up in an airlock.  Koenig ejects the machine into space, but its antenna is trapped when the outer door cycles shut.  Brian threatens to erase his memory core unless he is brought back aboard.  The Alphans must proceed cautiously as Brian is linked to the only available working computer.  Despite the threat, Koenig orders the antenna cut and the robot set adrift.  Begging for mercy, Brian breaks down, sobbing as it offers to give the Alphans anything they want.

Later, Main Computer is restored using Brian's memory core.  The first operation performed is to verify the Moon's present trajectory; the data confirms their course remains unchanged.  Hoping to cause confusion with this red herring, Brian the Brain was apparently manipulating Computer from the very beginning.  Regarding the robot, the Alphans elect to give it a second chance.  The memory core will be returned to Brian—once programmed with a proper sense of morality.  Afterward, Koenig and Helena make a date to discuss the results of the love test...

Cast

Starring 
Martin Landau — Commander John Koenig
Barbara Bain — Doctor Helena Russell

Also Starring 
Catherine Schell — Maya

Featuring 
Tony Anholt — Tony Verdeschi

Guest Star 
Bernard Cribbins — Captain Michael and Voice of 'Brian'

Also Featuring 
 John Hug — Astronaut Bill Fraser
Marc Zuber — Security Lieutenant
Michael Sharvell-Martin — Robot 'Brian'
Annie Lambert — Command Centre Operative
Yasuko Nagazumi — Yasko

Uncredited Artists 
 Robert Reeves — Peter
 Quentin Pierre — Security Guard

Music 
The score was re-edited from previous Space: 1999 incidental music tracks composed for the second series by Derek Wadsworth and draws primarily from the scores of "The Metamorph" and "The Taybor".

Production Notes

 The scene where the Alphans begin their psychological attack on Brian was scripted to have Maya first resume her normal form.  As the robot became agitated, the three Alphans would comment that it required maintenance and would bombard Brian with pleas to be the one to perform the task.  At this point, Maya would appear as Captain Michael to further confound the Brain.  This sequence was deleted from the final cut.  Also removed was a line where Brian commented that Computer was incapable of speech (in direct contradiction of numerous earlier episodes where the Computer voice was performed by Barbara Kelly).
 Cast in the dual role of the late Captain Michael and the voice of his mad robotic creation, 'Brian', was British actor and comedian Bernard Cribbins.  Cribbins is well known for voicing all the characters in the BBC children's programme The Wombles and as a celebrity story-reader on Jackanory.  More recently, Cribbins played Wilfred Mott, the grandfather of Doctor Who companion Donna Noble; the Mott character then went on to become the Tenth Doctor's final companion in David Tennant's two-part farewell story, "The End of Time".
 To allow for a natural rapport to develop between the actors and 'Brian', Cribbins performed the voice during the live-action filming (which was then altered in post-production to give it a metallic quality).  The robot prop was operated by Michael Sharvell-Martin, a British actor and pantomime dame best remembered for his supporting roles in The Benny Hill Show and No Place Like Home.
 This would be the final episode where viewers would see the original version of Maya's Psychon make-up.  ITC executives felt Catherine Schell's vision with the brown-pigmented ears read on screen as 'dirty'.  After this, her ears would be left natural and the 'sideburn' cheekbone pigment would become less prominent.
 The Swift miniature was designed by Ron Burton as a landing craft for the Gerry Anderson production The Day After Tomorrow.  Built by model builder Martin Bower, the Bray Studios effects team added the two large upper tanks to contain the freon gas used to simulate the ship's rocket exhaust.

Novelisation 
The episode was adapted in the second Year Two Space: 1999 novel Mind-Breaks of Space by Michael Butterworth and J. Jeff Jones published in 1977.  The deleted sequences noted above were included in the manuscript.

References

External links 
Space: 1999 - "Brian the Brain" - The Catacombs episode guide
Space: 1999 - "Brian the Brain" - Moonbase Alpha's Space: 1999 Page

1976 British television episodes
Space: 1999 episodes